Miodrag Stefanović (born February 2, 1977) is a Serbian former footballer, who currently is a scout for PAOK FC.

Career
In 2007, he moved from FK Slavija Sarajevo to FC SKA Rostov-on-Don. In 2008, he scored a goal in a game against FC Dynamo Bryansk. Before, he has played with Serbian clubs FK Radnički Beograd and FK Rad, with a short 6 months spell in Turkey with Altay.

References

External links
 Stats on official site of Metallurg Lipetsk
 Miodrag Stefanovic on totalfootball
 Profile at Srbijafudbal

1977 births
Living people
Footballers from Belgrade
Serbian footballers
Serbian expatriate footballers
FK Radnički Beograd players
FK Rad players
FK Sloga Kraljevo players
FK Slavija Sarajevo players
FC SKA Rostov-on-Don players
Expatriate footballers in Russia
Association football defenders
FC Metallurg Lipetsk players
PAOK FC non-playing staff